The Frioul archipelago is a group of four islands located off the Mediterranean coast of France, approximately  from Marseille.  The islands of the archipelago cover a total land area of approximately 200 hectares. According to the 2015 census, the population was 146.
 

The islands of Pomègues and Ratonneau are connected by a mole built in 1822.

See also
 Dürer's Rhinoceros

References

External links

www.frioul.net 
www.frequence-sud.fr, ferries to Frioul 

 
Geography of Marseille
Mediterranean islands
Islands of Provence-Alpes-Côte d'Azur
Archipelagoes of Europe
Landforms of Provence-Alpes-Côte d'Azur